Java bean may refer to:

Java coffee, the coffee 
JavaBeans, the software
Enterprise JavaBeans, the server software